refers to several independent organized Shinto groups that were excluded by law in 1882 from government-run State Shinto. These independent groups may have more developed belief systems than mainstream Shrine Shinto which focuses more on rituals.

It emerged as a product of increasing discussion among people of lower classes about theology

Starting in the late Edo period, Sect Shinto became established in the Meiji era, after the Meiji Restoration. One denomination (Jingu-kyo, affiliated with the Ise Grand Shrine) left during the war, and the final group (before the war) consisted of 13 denominations, which were once also referred to as the 13 Shinto schools.

In a broad sense, it includes "Oomoto" which newly joined the "Sect Shinto Federation" after the war. (After the war, "Oomoto" newly joined the "Sect Shinto Federation," while "Tenrikyo" and "Shinto Taiseikyo" left, so that the number of denominations belonging to the "Sect Shinto Federation" is currently 12.)

In contrast, to shrine Shinto, which is an aggregation of various shrines and customary beliefs in various parts of Japan (which became united under the Ise Grand Shrine after the Meiji period), denominational Shinto is a form of Shinto that is based on the Kokugaku and Shrine Shinto, which is a form of Shinto that seeks a fundamental and comprehensive faith (as in the late Edo period, the Kokugaku). Great Teaching Institute (influenced by the Kokugaku and Fukko Shinto lineages of the late Edo period, which sought a fundamental and comprehensive faith), and because of its comprehensive nature, the central institution and cult, the Great Teaching Institute later reformed into the Bureau of Shinto Affairs and later the Shinto Taikyo as the central institution and cult, and all the deities, starting with the original deity Ame-no-Minakanushi, as well as all the deities (Amatsukami and Kunitsukami). Tenrikyo is often considered a separate monotheistic religion founded by Nakayama Miki but it was categorized as Sect Shinto.

Overview 
Around 1868, at the beginning of the Meiji Restoration, the religious administration of the new Meiji government issued the Shinto-Buddhist Separation Order, resulting in the Haibutsu Kishaku and the restoration of the Unity of ritual and government system in the same year. The Great Teaching Institute was established in 1872 (Meiji 5) as a missionary organization, but was dissolved in 1875 (Meiji 8). Instead, the Shinto side established the Bureau of Shinto Affairs in the same year, to which the originally disparate folk belief religions belonged, and those denominations that met certain conditions, such as the number of followers, were officially recognized as "independent denominations". This was the beginning of the denominational Shinto.

Beginning with Kurozumikyō and Shinto Shusei in 1876 (9th year of Meiji), and in 1886, Bureau of Shinto Affairs (later renamed Shinto Taikyo), and in 1899 (32nd year of Meiji), it was reorganized into a denomination called Jingu-kyo renamed Ise Shrine Offering Association. In 1908, Tenrikyo was founded, and by the time of 1908, there were a total of 13 schools (14 schools in total if the breakaway "Jingu-kyo" is included).

After the war, Oomoto also joined the federation, but Tenrikyo and Shinto Taiseikyo withdrew from the federation, so the federation now has 12 affiliated groups.

There are five main groups of Sect Shinto

 The Fukkoshinto or Revival Shinto lineage includes Shinto Taikyo, Shinrikyo, and Izumo-taishakyo, which originates from Izumo Taisha.
 The Mountain worship lineage includes Jikkō kyō, Fuso-kyo, and Ontake-kyo.
 Purification sects are Misogikyo and Shinshu-kyo.
 Utopian groups are Kurozumikyō, Tenrikyo, and Konkokyo.

Tenrikyo is now classified by the Agency for Cultural Affairs as one of the various religions, not as a Shinto denomination.

Establishment of the system of denominational Shinto 
The impetus for denominational Shinto was the separation of Shinto and Buddhism, which began with the 1868 (first year of Meiji) revival of the Department of Divinities and the Shinto and Buddhism Separation Order, which led to the formation of the Unity of ritual and government was formed by the state, and the concept of missionaries to propagate Shinto remained. Once the Bureau of Shinto Affairs was prepared, which brought together the traditionally existing shrines, Shinto koshas, and churches of folk beliefs, each denomination that met certain conditions became independent from it.

In 1870 (Meiji 3), an imperial edict of Proclamation of the Great Doctrine was issued, and in 1876 (Meiji 9), a dormitory was established in the Shinto Office to train priests. However, with the spread of the separation of church and state and freedom of religion, the Kyodo Shoku came to an end, and with it, the idea that it was necessary to establish an institution that was a more developed version of the former Shodo Shido Practice Center grew stronger. Accordingly, the Meiji government established the Office of Japanese Classics Research in Tokyo Prefecture, independent of the Bureau of Shinto Affairs, in order to organize the exploration of ideas unique to Japan. It was later succeeded by Kokugakuin University.

Formation of a united government 
The Separation of Shinto and Buddhism, which started with the Shinto-Buddhist Hanzen Order, a Daijo-kan directive, also progressed at the same time. In 1870 (Meiji 3) Proclamation of the Great Doctrine was passed. In 1872 (Meiji 5), the Missionary Office was abolished.

Ministry of Religion, Kyodo Shoku, and the Great Teaching Institute 

In March 1872 (Meiji 5), the Ministry of Religion was established, and in April Kyodo Shoku positions were assigned to priests and monks. There were 14 ranks in the Kyodo Shoku, which proclaimed the Three Great Teachings. The Ministry of Religion would be abolished in 1880. Initially, the priesthood was divided into two parts, east and west, on April 29, and the eastern president was Ise Grand Shrine High Priest Konoe Tadafusa , the president of the West is Izumo Taisha's Omiya Tsukasa . It showed the appearance of a power struggle.

In May 1873 (Meiji 6), the Ministry of Religion established the church intention, which is the standard for approval of the lecture company, and in August, Kurozumi, later Buddhist Kami, and Mitake. In addition to Mt. Fuji, which was later a Buddhist religion, a Buddhist lecture company was also approved.

In 1873, Great Teaching Institute was established, first in Kojimachi Kioicho and later in Zojo, Shiba, as the head temple of a joint Shinto and Buddhist sect. The Great Teaching Institute was placed at the initiative of the Buddhist side in order to concretize the teaching by the Ministry of Religion, but it became all about Shinto. The Buddhist side of the movement broke away from the Shinshū and, On April 30, 1875 (Meiji 8), the Great Teaching Institute was dissolved by a directive of the Ministry of Religion. Prior to this, the Bureau of Shinto Affairs was formed in March by a group of Shinto priests and instructors belonging to private Shinto-related organizations, as well as shrines throughout Japan, centering on Ise Grand Shrine.
. The Shinto side sensed that there was no organization that corresponded to the various Buddhist sects, and On March 27, 1875 (Meiji 8), Grand High Priest Suechi Sanjonishi, Grand Priest-in-Charge Inaba Masakuni, Yoriyasu Tanaka, and Konosetsu Tsume jointly petitioned the Ministry of Religion for the establishment of a Shinto office. Masakuni Inaba was the first president of the Bureau of Shinto Affairs,  Yoriyasu Tanaka was the Chief of Ise Jingu and the first head of Jingu-Kyo. ,  was the grand priest of Hikawa Shrine and the first headmaster of Shinto Taiseikyo and Ontake-Kyo. Hung Sesuen Tsume would become the second head minister of the Ontake Sect.

Bureau of Shinto Affairs 

The next day, March 28, 1875 (Meiji 8), he received permission to establish the Bureau of Shinto Affairs. On April 8, he asked the Ministry of Religion for permission to establish the Bureau of Shinto Affairs, and the content of the request was that the present situation was such that Shinto could not be coordinated as a Shinto religion, but that even small Shinto shrines should be coordinated around the Ise Jingu Grand Shrine for the propagation of Shinto. On April 15, the Bureau of Shinto Affairs was opened within the Tokyo Branch of the Jingu Office.  Since the Bureau of Shinto Affairs was a collection of shrines and koshas from all over the country, various denominations were able to branch out and become independent from it. In 1876 (9th year of Meiji), the year after the opening of the bureau, the Kurozumikyō, and Shinto Shusei, which had been flourishing, became independent denominations.

Jingu Haruhai-den and the controversy over the deities of the shrine 

The Bureau of Shinto Affairs had a plan to make the Jingu Haruhaiden, which succeeded the Great Teaching Institute, the central temple  and a center for missionary work. The Jingu Haruhaiden was later to become the Tokyo Daijingu. By order of the Meiji Emperor, a great conference on Shinto was held in January 1881 (Meiji 14), attended by 118 people, including all the chief priests of the government buildings and the instructors of the sixth grade and above, but the issue could not be settled and was settled in February by the imperial decision of the Meiji Emperor.

Separation of Ritual and Faith 
In January 1882, the separation of ritual and religion was enacted by the Ministry of Home Affairs through B No. 7, which prohibited those in the priest-teacher position from performing rituals, thereby promoting the separation of those who continued to be priests performing rituals or preaching the teachings, and solidifying the formation of Sect Shinto.After this, on May 15, 1882, the six factions, including Jingu-kyo, became independent, and the Jingu Haruhayashiden, which was the source of the ritual god controversy that was transferred to Jingu-kyo's ownership, was renamed Daijingu Shrine, and Jingu Taima was distributed by Jingu-kyo. Separation of church and state under the intention of separation of church and state through the unity of church and state, and the clear formation of Sect Shinto.When the Kyodo Shoku position is abolished, the Bureau of Shinto Affairs loses its original reason for opening. In 1886, the Bureau of Shinto Affairs, which had been the official central organ of Shinto, changed its name to the Shinto Taikyo and became one of the schools of Shinto.

Separation of Church and State 
In December 1868 (the first year of Meiji), the Imperial Academy was established in Kyoto but was abolished the following year, and when the Ministry of Religion was established, the Ministry was responsible for research.

In 1882 (Meiji 15), institutes of imperial studies were established one after another. The reason for this was the background of the keen awareness of the need for doctrinal studies in the rites and rituals controversy. The rituals of the state Shinto religion, the doctrines and teachings of the doctrinalists of the denominational Shinto religion, and the academic study of the doctrines and teachings by the national scholars, the rite and shrine controversy was divided between the doctrinalists and the national scholars, and as the doctrinalists became independent, the national scholars were stimulated and the separation of doctrine and learning progressed. On April 30, Jingu-Kyo establishes Jingu Kōgakkan in Ise. On May 30, the Department of Classics is established at the University of Tokyo.

Office of Japanese Classics Research 

On November 4, 1881, the Office of Japanese Classics Research was established,  a unified Shinto missionary organization, was established to train Shinto priests for the Bureau of Shinto Affairs. It was founded in 1881, using the imperial gift as a source of funds, by purchasing a mansion in Iidacho, Kojimachi-ku (present-day Chiyoda-ku).

Prince Arisugawa Takahito was appointed as the first president, and announced his intention to pursue a unique Japanese academic discipline. In the "Announcement of the Establishment of the Imperial Academy," jointly signed by Li-Kuro Kubo, Yorikuni Inoue, Nakasaburo Itsumi, and Hans Shishino, the intention of the establishment of the academy was to train personnel to maintain Kokutai. The Imperial Institute established branches in the provinces and qualified students for the priesthood.

The Ministry of Religion, Kyodo Shoku, and the Grand Council of Churches 
In March 1872 (Meiji 5), the Ministry of Religion was established, and in April, Kyodo Shoku positions were assigned to priests and monks. There were 14 ranks in the Kyodo Shoku, and the Great Doctrine was proclaimed. The Kyodo Shoku would be abolished in 1880. The priesthood was initially divided into two divisions on April 29, with the eastern division headed by Konoe Tadafusa, priest of Ise Jingu Shrine, and the western division headed by Senke Takanofuku, the grand priest of Izumo Taisha Shrine, and since it was assumed that one's religious affiliation was free, there was a struggle for power between the Ise and Izumo factions.

In May 1873, the Ministry of Religion issued a church ordinance, which set standards for the approval of kosha. In August, the Ministry approved the Kurozumikyō, the later Misogi-Kyo (Tohokami), the Mitake, and the later Fuso-kyo (Fuji Isan), as well as Buddhist kosha.

In 1873, the Great Teaching Institute was established as a joint Shinto and Buddhist head temple for Kyodo Shoku, first in Kojimachi-Kioicho and later in Masukami in Shiba. The Great Teaching Institute was the brainchild of the Buddhist side and was set up in order to materialize the indoctrination by the Ministry of Religion, but it became all about Shinto. The Buddhist side, led by Shinshū, broke away from the religion. On April 30, 1875, the Great Teaching Institute was dissolved by order of the Ministry of Religion. Prior to this, the Bureau of Shinto Affairs was formed in March by a group of Shinto shrines, mainly at Ise Shrine, and other shrines throughout Japan, as well as Shinto priests and instructors belonging to private Shinto-related kosha. The Shinto side sensed that there was no organization that would correspond to the Buddhist sects. On March 27, 1875, the Grand High Priestess Sanjonishi Sechi, the Grand High Priestess Inaba Masakuni, Yoriyou Tanaka, and Kosetsu Tsume jointly petitioned the Ministry of Religion to establish a Bureau of Shinto Affairs. Masakuni Inaba was the first president of the Bureau of Shinto Affairs. Yoriyou Tanaka is the Grand Priest of Ise Shrine and the first head of the Jingu-Kyo sect,  was the Grand Priest of Hikawa Shrine and the first head of Shinto Taiseikyo and Ontake-kyo. Kousetsu Tsume would become the second head priest of Utake-Kyo.

Bureau of Shinto Affairs 
The next day, March 28, 1875, he received permission to establish the Bureau of Shinto Affairs. On April 8, he asked the Ministry of Religion for permission to establish a Bureau of Shinto Affairs. The content of the request was that even small shrines, centering on the Imperial Shrine at Ise, should be able to cooperate with each other for the purpose of propagating Shinto. On April 15, the Bureau of Shinto Affairs was opened in the Tokyo Branch Office of the Jingu Shichosha. In 1876, the year following the opening of the office, the Kurozumikyō and Shusei sects of Shinto became independent sects. In 1876, the year following the opening of the office, the Kurozumikyō and Shusei sects of Shinto became independent sects.

Jingu Haruhai-den and the controversy over the deities of the shrine 

The Bureau of Shinto Affairs has the Jingu Haruhai-den, which succeeds the Great Teaching Institute, as the central temple. There was a plan to make it a missionary base. Since the shrine would enshrine the spirit of Amaterasu, the Emperor visited the shrine and obtained permission from the Shoin, as well as the Ministry of Religion, to begin construction. Jingu Haruhayashiden is later known as Tokyo Grand Shrine.  opinion on the deities to be dedicated to the temples of the Bureau of Shinto Affairs was so controversial that by 1880, it was divided into the Ise and Izumo factions. At the order of the Meiji Emperor, a Shinto Grand Council was held in January 1881. 118 people, including all the priests in the government buildings and the teaching staff of the 6th grade and above, participated in the council, but the council was unable to reach an agreement, and the matter was settled in February by an imperial decree of the Meiji Emperor.

Sects 
In 1899 (Meiji 32), Shinto Headquarters (Shinto Taikyo), Shinrikyo, and Misogi-kyo join, and the name is changed to "Shinto Konwakai"; furthermore, in 1912 (Meiji 45), Konkokyo, Shinto Shusei, and Tenrikyo join, forming 13 groups, and the name is changed to "Shinto Interfaith Association". In 1934, the current name was adopted.

In 1956, Oomoto joined. Tenrikyo left the association in 1970 (Showa 45). 1976 (Showa 51), Shinto Taiseikyo resigned its membership. Also, Shinshu-kyo withdrew in 1959 and returned in 1994.

In 1995, on the occasion of the 100th anniversary of its formation, the "100th Anniversary of the Formation of the Federation of Shinto Churches" was held. In addition to Misogi-kyo, Shinto Taikyo, Jikkō kyō, Konkokyo, Kurozumikyō, Fuso-kyo, Ontake-kyo, Shinrikyo, Oomoto, Shinshu-kyo, Shinto Shusei, Izumo Taisha-kyo, and twelve other denominations, the presidents of Tenrikyo and Shinto Taiseikyo also attended.

Kurozumikyō 
Kurozumikyō (黒住教) is a group highly linked to Amaterasu.

Shinto Shusei 

 is a Sect Shinto organization and one of the thirteen shinto sects. It is considered a form of Confucian Shinto

He considered allegiance to the Emperor of Japan to be central to his philosophy

He founded the sect in 1849 at age twenty considering Japanese people to be descendants of deities

He was a supporter of Sonnō jōi but supported the Boshin Rebellion and the Meiji Restoration later.

There are 7004 followers today

Alongside Kurozumikyō it was one of the first two shinto sects to gain independence in 1876.

Jingu-kyo 
 was a sect run out of Ise Grand Shrine which distributed Jingu Taima. It was a rival to Izumo-taishakyo and eventually left the federation and came to dominate State Shinto.

Izumo-taishakyo 

Fuso-kyo 
 is a Mountain Worship sect

Hasegawa Kakugyo (who was also associated with Jikkō kyō) is traditionally seen as having founded it

Jikkō kyō 
 is a Mountain Worship sect

Hasegawa Kakugyo (who was also associated with Fuso-kyo) is traditionally seen as having founded it

Shinto Taiseikyo 

Shinshu-kyo 
 is a "purification sect" alongside Misogikyo.

It was founded by Masaki Yoshimura who lived from 1839-1915 He was a survivor of the Ansei Purge. and worked at Ise Jingu and later was head of Tatsuta Shrine, but due to laws restricting teaching he entrusted his children to Itō Hirobumi (before he became Prime Minister) and established a new branch based on his family traditions

Ontake-kyo 
 is a Mountain worship sect dedicated to Mount Ontake. It had 3 million members in 1930. But as of 2020 it only has around 40,000 members

Shinto Taikyo 

Shintō Taikyō (神道大教) is the direct successor to the Great Teaching Institute. 

Its name Taikyo refers to the Three Great Teachings first proclamed in the Proclamation of the Great Doctrine. and it is linked to the historical Great Teaching Institute

Shinrikyo 
It was founded in 1880

He had previously studied medicine and was an advocate of traditional Japanese medicine. He studied kokugaku in his youth under Nishida Naokai

The name is relatively common among Shinto groups and does not stand out Aum Shinrikyo uses different characters in its name though.

It is considered in the Fukkoshinto lineage of Sect Shinto alongside Shinto Taikyo and Izumo-taishakyo. It is among the thirteen shinto sects.

His thought blurred the lines between monotheism and polytheism, entering transtheism. Sano's concept of kami was aimed at resisting the propagation of Christianity while composing teachings that were in line with the aims of popular national indoctrination. His core elements of the concept of kami did not change throughout his life.

He saw this as emphasizing the interconnectedness of everything from humans to nature, and as such this could be intereted as a monotheistic view. He saw all the kami as unified under a divine principle, hence the name of the group.

Misogikyo 
 is considered a "purification sect" alongside Shinshu-kyo.

It's name literally means Misogi religion

The group is quite obscure today It is very ritual focused with little theoretical theology. In this way it contrasts with Yoshida Shinto. It emphasizes right state of mind and self control It has influence from Confucian Shinto but is its own tradition

Konkokyo 
 is a group often considered its own religion which emerged from Shinbutsu-shūgō

Tenrikyo 
 is a sect shinto group often considered a separate religion from Shinto

Tensha Tsuchimikado Shinto 

In the Edo period, the Tsuchimikado family, descendants of Abe no Seimei, established Tensha Tsuchimikado Shinto influenced by Confucian Shinto through . However, because of the inclusion of fortune-telling and magic, the Meiji government considered it pagan and issued the "". After the war, it was restored as a religious corporation "Tensha Tsuchimikado Shinto Headquarters", but in the registration as a Religious corporation, it is neither a Sect Shinto nor a Shinto shrine, and it is classified as a "Religious corporation".

Oomoto 
 is a group often seen as a new religion

New Sect Shinto 

New Sect Shinto is a Japanese Shinto grouping. It is a subset of Sect Shinto. The remainder of Sectarian Shinto is Sect Shinto. New Sect Shinto consists of numerous organizations. It is influenced by Buddhism and Confucianism. In Japanese, the New Sect Shinto is called shin kyoha Shinto.

It is part of the Sect Shinto movement not centering upon 13 sects. New Shinto sects have shamanistic leadership, syncretism of religious and philosophical beliefs, closely knit social organization, and individualism. Some groups have characteristics of monotheism, in the extreme case making a compromise of Buddhism, Confucianism, and folk religion.

Shinto Order by GHQ 

On December 15, 1945, the Supreme Commander for the Allied Powers (GHQ) issued the Shinto Directive aimed at dismantling state Shinto. In January of the following year, the Dai Nihon Shinto-kai, the Imperial Academy, and the Jingu Bonan-kai were dissolved to form the Association of Shinto Shrines, a religious corporation. In March, Jingu-Shogakukan University is abolished by the Shinto directive; in April, representatives of each denomination explain their own denomination to the GHQ Civilian Information and Education Department at Broadcasting Hall 108. In June, at a meeting at Tenrikyo's Honshiba Grand Church between the presidents of the various schools and W. K. Vance, head of the Religious Affairs Division at GHQ, the occupying forces promised not to impose any restrictions on the religious activities of the Shinto sects.

Restoration of Tenrikyo and Konkokyo's Council on Educational System 
Tenrikyo established a policy of restoration immediately in 1945, and Konkokyo established the Council for the Establishment of the Faith in 1951 to eliminate Shinto colors.

The Religious Corporation Law and the New Shinto Religions 
The system in which there were 13 Shinto sects and 13 Buddhist sects recognized by the government was broken up into even smaller groups as religious organizations when the Religious Corporation Law was enacted.

Later Shinto research institutions 
Many of the scholars who had played a central role in Shinto research and education were expelled and replaced by folklorists such as Shinobu Orikuchi and Kunio Yanagita, as well as younger Shinto scholars who escaped expulsion. On March 20, 1946, Kokugakuin University became a corporation, and the training of priests, which had been commissioned by the Ministry of Home Affairs, was continued from April as a new commission from the Jinja Main Office. The following year, Vance and Woodard of the Religious Affairs Division of GHQ decided that there was no problem with the study of Shinto and training of priests as a private university, and in 1948, the Shinto Affairs Department was established to form a Shinto training organization.

The Shinto Scholarship Association, which had been conducting Shinto courses, was also dissolved in 1946. In July 1949, at a meeting of the Federation of Shinto Sects at the Kinko Grand Church of the Tenrikyo Tokyo Branch Office, it was decided that Shinto lectures would be held at the Shinto Training Department of Kokugakuin University on behalf of the Federation of Shinto Sects, and this continued from that year until 1966.By holding the Shinto course at Kokugakuin University, he planned to create an image of the university as a Shinto university that combines both shrines Shinto and Sect Shinto. As of 1996, Kokugakuin University is said to be the only university with a course on Sect Shinto.

See also 

 Ko-Shintō
 Shinbutsu-shūgō
 Haibutsu kishaku

Annotations

Footnotes

References

Works referenced 

 
 （文庫：1994年.ISBN 4886924603.）「教派神道に流れる古神道の本質」の章あり.
 
 
 小滝透『神々の目覚め-近代日本の宗教革命』春秋社, 1997年7月.ISBN 978-4393291245.
 田中義能『神道十三派の研究 (上・下)』 第一書房, 1987年. 昭和初期に刊行された同書の復刻版.

External links 
 Official site of Kyōha Shintō Rengōkai (in Japanese)

Shinto
Shinto new religious movements
Shinto in Japan